Edward Weinfeld (May 14, 1901 – January 17, 1988) was a United States district judge of the United States District Court for the Southern District of New York.

Education and career

Born on May 14, 1901, in New York City, New York, Weinfeld received a Bachelor of Laws in 1921 from the New York University School of Law and a Master of Laws in 1922 from the same institution. He served as chief counsel for the New York State Legislative Committee Investigating Bondholders Commission in 1935. He was the Commissioner of Housing for the State of New York from 1939 to 1942. He was Vice President and Director of the Citizens Housing and Planning Council for the State of New York from 1943 to 1950.

His brother was New York assemblyman and judge Morris Weinfeld.

Federal judicial service

Weinfeld was nominated by President Harry S. Truman on July 10, 1950, to a seat on the United States District Court for the Southern District of New York vacated by Judge Simon H. Rifkind. He was confirmed by the United States Senate on August 1, 1950, and received his commission on August 5, 1950. He was a member of the Judicial Panel on Multidistrict Litigation from 1968 to 1978. His service terminated on January 17, 1988, due to his death in New York City.

See also
List of Jewish American jurists

References

Sources

 Edward Weinfeld: A Judicious Life. New York: Federal Bar Foundation, 1998.

 This article incorporates facts obtained from the public domain Biographical Directory of Federal Judges compiled by the Federal Judicial Center.

1901 births
1988 deaths
New York University School of Law alumni
Judges of the United States District Court for the Southern District of New York
United States district court judges appointed by Harry S. Truman
20th-century American judges
20th-century American lawyers